Neukrotimyy ("Inquisitive") was a Project 1135M Burevestnik-class ("Petrel") Guard Ship (SKR) or 'Krivak II'-class frigate that served with the Soviet and Russian Navies. The vessel was known as Komsomolets Litvyy between 1987 and 1990. Launched on 17 September 1977, Neukrotimyy was designed to operate as an anti-submarine vessel with the Baltic Fleet, using an armament built around the Metel Anti-Ship Complex. The vessel undertook many visits to other countries outside the Soviet Unions, including Angola, East Germany, Nigeria and Poland. Following the dissolution of the Soviet Union, in 1991, the ship was transferred to the Russian Navy and continued to travel to countries like the Netherlands. Despite being accidentally holed in 2005 and being badly burnt in a fire in 2008, Neukrotimyy remained the penultimate of the class to remain in service, finally being decommissioned on 29 June 2009.

Design and development
Neukrotimyy was one of eleven Project 1135M ships launched between 1975 and 1981. Project 1135, the Burevestnik ("Petrel") class, was envisaged by the Soviet Navy as a less expensive complement to the Project 1134A Berkut A (NATO reporting name 'Kresta II') and Project 1134B Berkut B (NATO reporting name 'Kara') classes of anti-submarine ships. Project 1135M was an improvement developed in 1972 with slightly increased displacement and heavier guns compared with the basic 1135. The design, by N. P. Sobolov, combined a powerful missile armament with good seakeeping for a blue water role. The ships were designated Guard Ship (SKR) to reflect their substantial greater anti-ship capability than the earlier members of the class and the Soviet strategy of creating protected areas for friendly submarines close to the coast. NATO forces called the vessels 'Krivak II'-class frigates.

Power was provided by two  M7K power sets, each consisting of a combination of a  DK59 and a  M62 gas turbine arranged in a COGAG installation and driving one fixed-pitch propeller. The ship’s complement was 194, including 23 officers.

Armament and sensors
Neukrotimyy was designed for anti-submarine warfare around four URPK-5 Rastrub missiles (NATO reporting name SS-N-14 'Silex'), backed up by a pair of quadruple launchers for  torpedoes and a pair of RBU-6000  Smerch-2 anti-submarine rocket launchers. Both the URPK-5 and the torpedoes also had anti-ship capabilities. Defence against aircraft was provided by forty 4K33 OSA-M (SA-N-4 'Gecko') surface to air missiles which were launched from two twin-arm ZIF-122 launchers. Two  AK-100 guns were mounted aft in a superfiring arrangement.

The ship had a well-equipped sensor suite, including a single MR-310A Angara-A air/surface search radar, Don navigation radar, the MP-401S Start-S ESM radar system and the Spectrum-F laser warning system. Fire control for the guns was provided by a MR-143 Lev-214 radar. The vessel was also equipped with the PK-16 decoy-dispenser system which used chaff as a form of missile defense.

Construction and career
Laid down by on 22 January 1976 with the yard number 163 at the Yantar Shipyard in Kaliningrad, Neukrotimyy was launched on 7 September 1977. The ship was the fifth of the class built at the yard. The vessel, named for a Russian word that can be translated as Indomitable, was commissioned on 30 December and joined the Baltic Fleet.

Soon after entering service, Neukrotimyy was sent on missions to foreign missions to promote friendly relationships between the Soviet Union and other nations. Between 5 and 10 June 1978, the vessel visited Rostock in East Germany. In 1982, the vessel travelled to Africa, spending time in Luanda, Angola, between 12 and 18 June and in Lagos, Nigeria, between 25 June and 2 July. In 1985, the ship travelled to Gdynia in Poland with the Project 58 (NATO reporting name Kynda class) cruiser  to commemorate the end of the Second World War, staying for three days from 5 June before returning to Rostock for four days from 7 October.

In honour of the members of the Young Communist League, or Komsomol, of Lithuania, the ship was renamed Komsomolets Litvyy on 2 November 1987. However, the new name did not last long, reverting back on 27 March 1990. Lithuania had declared independence from the Soviet Union 16 days beforehand. June that year saw Neukrotimyy take another tour of the Baltic Sea, taking in Kiel for three days from 5 June, and Szczecin, Poland, for three days from 21 June. The following year saw the ship travel to the Netherlands, a NATO member, visiting Amsterdam between 2 and 6 September. With the dissolution of the Soviet Union on 26 December 1991, Neukrotimyy was transferred to the Russian Navy. Travels outside the Baltic continued. For example, between 23 and 24 April 1997, the ship could be found at the port of Rotterdam in the Netherlands.

Neukrotimyy continued to serve into the next decade. However, the new century brought a succession of mishaps. 30 July 2005 saw a celebration of the might of the Russian Navy take place in front of the Winter Palace in St Petersburg. Unfortunately, a dummy mine that was to be detonated as part of the spectacle drifted and struck the side of the hull, filling the engine room with water. The swift intervention of the crew saved the ship. Three years later, on 8 December 2008, a fire broke out in the same engine room. Although extinguished, it proved the end for the ship. Neukrotimyy was decommissioned on 29 June 2009. An attempt was made to turn the vessel, the penultimate of the class to be taken out of service, over to a museum, but this failed. Instead the vessel was stored at Baltiysk ready to be broken up but sank in situ on 3 October 2012.

References

Citations

Bibliography

 
 
 
 
 
 
 
 
 

1977 ships
Cold War frigates of the Soviet Union
Krivak-class frigates
Krivak-class frigates of the Russian Navy
Ships built at Yantar Shipyard
Ships built in the Soviet Union